Union Township, Nebraska may refer to the following places:

Union Township, Butler County, Nebraska
Union Township, Dodge County, Nebraska
Union Township, Knox County, Nebraska
Union Township, Phelps County, Nebraska
Union Township, Saunders County, Nebraska

See also
West Union Township, Custer County, Nebraska
Union Township (disambiguation)

Nebraska township disambiguation pages